Hubert Lee Bobo (July 2, 1934 – September 1, 1999) was an American football linebacker. He played college football at Ohio State, and played professionally in the American Football League for the Los Angeles Chargers in 1960 and for the New York Titans from 1961–1962. Hubert also played professionally in the Canadian Football League during the 1958 season as a member of the Hamilton Tiger-Cats. Prior to his professional career Bobo was a dominating force in high school football as a running back, linebacker, and kicker. Bobo still to this day holds several state of Ohio and national records for his efforts at the high school level. After his high school career ended, Bobo attended The Ohio State University sharing a backfield with Bobby Watkins and Howard "Hopalong" Cassady helping lead the Buckeyes to an undefeated season and the 1954 National Championship.

See also
 List of American Football League players

External links
Just Sports Stats

1934 births
1999 deaths
People from Athens, Ohio
Players of American football from Ohio
American football linebackers
Canadian football linebackers
American players of Canadian football
Ohio State Buckeyes football players
Hamilton Tiger-Cats players
Los Angeles Chargers players
New York Titans (AFL) players